Manuel Majo (17 April 1909 – 9 March 1955) was a Spanish water polo player. He competed in the men's tournament at the 1928 Summer Olympics.

References

1909 births
1955 deaths
Spanish male water polo players
Olympic water polo players of Spain
Water polo players at the 1928 Summer Olympics
Water polo players from Barcelona